Jordan Brown  (born September 14, 1989) is a Canadian politician who was elected to the Newfoundland and Labrador House of Assembly in the 2019 Newfoundland and Labrador general election. He represents the electoral district of Labrador West as a member of the Newfoundland and Labrador New Democratic Party (NL NDP). He was re-elected in the 2021 provincial election.

Brown trained as a welder in Happy Valley-Goose Bay and returned to Labrador City to work. In 2013 he helped restart the local Heritage Society. In 2014, he led a successful year-long campaign to have the Labrador flag recognized as the symbol of Labrador and flown at the land border crossings in Labrador and at government buildings. For his efforts in 2017 he was awarded the Labradorians' of Distinction Medal. In 2017, Brown unsuccessfully sought election to the Labrador City town council.

Political career 
In 2022, Brown criticized the provincial government's claim that the Trans-Labrador Highway had been completed. He argued that it isn't finished until a road reaches Labrador's north coast as far as Nain. In 2023, Brown criticized the diversion of obstetrical services from Happy Valley-Goose Bay to Labrador City, stating that Labrador City's hospital is too understaffed to provide for the central and northern regions of Labrador.

Brown has called for a provincial ban on scab workers.

Electoral history

References 

Living people
1989 births
Newfoundland and Labrador New Democratic Party MHAs
21st-century Canadian politicians
People from Labrador